Tsvetan Gashevski (born 15 July 1970 in Sofia) is a Bulgarian arm wrestler. He lives and works in Gorna Oryahovitsa and he is one of the founders of the Gorna Oryahovitsa Arm Wrestling Club. Gashevski started his sport career with athletics but soon switched to Arm wrestling where he soon achieved great results - multiple Champion of Bulgaria in the 75 kg category (right hand).

International competitions

He was one of the Top 10 sportspersons of Gorna Oryahovitsa in the 20th century and was awarded the prize of Gorna Oryahovitsa for sporting achievements in 2001 and made an Honorary Citizen of Gorna Oryahovitsa in 2002.

References 
 Honoured Citizens of Gorna Oryahovitsa 
World Armwrestling Federation World Championship Archives (2000-2009)
World Armwrestling Federation World Championship Archives (2010-2019)

Bulgarian arm wrestlers
1970 births
Living people
People from Gorna Oryahovitsa
Sportspeople from Veliko Tarnovo Province